Bilyutay (Büliuute) is a rural locality (a selo) in Selenginsky District, Republic of Buryatia, Russia. The population was 212 as of 2010. There are 11 streets.

Geography 
Bilyutay is located 96 km southeast of Gusinoozyorsk (the district's administrative centre) by road. Podlopatki and Verkhny Mangirtuy are the nearest rural locality.

References 

Rural localities in Selenginsky District